There are several regional types of Serbian cheeses, such as the Sjenica, Zlatar, Svrljig and Homolje cheeses.

Types

Cer cheese (cerski sir), made from goat milk, produced in the Cer mountain region
Homolje cheese (homoljski sir), white brined cheese, from cow, goat or sheep milk, produced in the Homolje valley and mountains 
Krivi Vir caciocavallo (krivovirski kačkavalj), yellow hard cheese, from sheep, cow and goat milk, produced in the Zaječar region, named after Krivi Vir 
Mokrin cheese (mokrinski sir), white brined cheese, named after Mokrin
Pirot caciocavallo (pirotski kačkavalj), hard cheese, produced in the Pirot region
Pule cheese (pule), smoked cheese, made from donkey milk, produced in Zasavica, world's most expensive cheese
Šar cheese (šarski sir), hard cheese, produced in Gora, Opolje and Štrpce (in Kosovo), named after Šar Mountains
Sjenica cheese (sjenički sir), white brined cheese, from sheep milk (traditionally), produced in the Pešter plateau, named after Sjenica, nominated for Intangible Cultural Heritage
Svrljig cheese (svrljiški sir), white brined cheese, cow milk, produced in the Nišava valley, named after Svrljig
Svrljig caciocavallo (svrljiški kačkavalj), yellow hard cheese (see kashkaval), from cow milk 
Zlatar cheese (zlatarski sir), white brined cheese, cow milk, produced in the Pešter plateau, named after Zlatar

Balkan Cheese Festival
There is an annual "Balkan Cheese Festival" in Serbia, held since 2013.

See also

Vurda, dairy specialty in southeastern Serbia
Kajmak, dairy specialty in the Balkans and Middle East
List of cheeses

References

Sources

 
Serbian cuisine
Serbian products with protected designation of origin